J. W. L. Forster or, more formally, John Wycliffe Lowes Forster (31 December 1850 – 24 April 1938) was a Canadian artist specializing in portraits. Many of his works can be found at the National Gallery of Canada.

Career
He began his training as an artist in Toronto in 1869 as an apprentice to the portrait painter John Wesley Bridgman (1833-1902). In 1871 he was awarded first prize in the amateur class at the annual fair of Upper Canada Agricultural Society for his portrait of Bridgman. In 1879 Forster studied for three months at the South Kensington Art School in London with Canadian landscape painter Charles Stuart Millard (1837-1917). After that, he attended the Académie Julian in Paris, studying with Jules Joseph Lefebvre and Gustave Boulanger (1880-1882); Tony Robert-Fleury and William-Adolphe Bouguereau; and later, with Carolus Duran. He returned to Toronto in 1883 and was elected an associate member of the Royal Canadian Academy of Arts. Among his writings are 2 volumes of autobiography and a survey of early Ontario artists.

Gallery

Works

Notes

External links
 
 John Wycliffe Lowes Forster at The Canadian Encyclopedia

1850 births
1938 deaths
Canadian portrait painters
19th-century Canadian painters
Canadian male painters
20th-century Canadian painters
19th-century Canadian male artists
20th-century Canadian male artists
Members of the Royal Canadian Academy of Arts